David Squires may refer to:
 David Squires (composer)
 David Squires (cartoonist)